Fragment may refer to:

Entertainment

Television and film
 "Fragments" (Torchwood), an episode from the BBC TV series
 "Fragments", an episode from the Canadian TV series Sanctuary
"Fragments" (Steven Universe Future), an episode from the American TV series Steven Universe Future
 Fragments (film) (a.k.a. Winged Creatures), a 2009 film
 Fragments: Chronicle of a Vanishing, a 1991 Croatian film

Music
 "Fragments" (song), a song by Jack Johnson
 "Fragments", a song from Endless Wire (The Who album)
 Fragments (Paul Bley album), a 1987 album by jazz pianist Paul Bley
 Fragments, an album by the Danish singer Jakob Sveistrup
 Fragments (EP), an EP by Rapids!
 Fragments, an EP by Chipzel
 Fragments (Bonobo album), a 2022 album by British producer Bonobo

Other
 Fragments, a play by Edward Albee
 Fragments: Memories of a Wartime Childhood 1939–1948, a fictional memoir of Holocaust survival by Binjamin Wilkomirski
 .hack//fragment, an online and offline RPG from the .hack video game series
Fragment (novel), a novel by Warren Fahy

Other
 Fragment (computer graphics), all the data necessary to generate a pixel in the frame buffer
 Fragment (logic), a syntactically restricted subset of a logical language
 URI fragment, the component of a URL following the "#" that identifies a portion of a larger document
 Literary fragment, a brief or unfinished work of prose
 Manuscript fragment, a remnant of a handwritten book
 Sentence fragment, a sentence not containing a subject or a predicate

See also
 Fragmentation (disambiguation)
 Part (disambiguation)
 Splinter (disambiguation)